Joseph "Joey" Blount (born November 16, 1998) is an American football safety for the Seattle Seahawks of the National Football League (NFL). He played college football at Virginia.

Professional career
Blount signed with the Seattle Seahawks as an undrafted free agent on April 30, 2022, following the 2022 NFL Draft. He made the Seahawks' 53-man final roster out of training camp. He played in 11 games exclusively on special teams, recording eight tackles and had a fumble recovery.

References

External links
 Seattle Seahawks bio
 Virginia Cavaliers bio

1998 births
Living people
American football safeties
Virginia Cavaliers football players
Seattle Seahawks players
Players of American football from Atlanta